Jin refer to:

States

Jìn 晉
 Jin (Chinese state) (晉國), major state of the Zhou dynasty, existing from the 11th century BC to 376 BC
 Jin dynasty (266–420) (晉朝), also known as Liang Jin and Sima Jin
 Jin (Later Tang precursor) (晉國; 907–923), Five Dynasties and Ten Kingdoms period
 Later Jin (Five Dynasties) (後晉; 936–947), Five Dynasties and Ten Kingdoms period

Jīn 金 
 Jin dynasty (1115–1234) (金朝), also known as the Jurchen Jin
 Later Jin (1616–1636) (後金; 1616–1636), precursor of the Qing dynasty

Others
 Jin (Korean state) (辰國), precursor of the Jinhan Confederation
 Balhae (698–713), originally known as Jin (震)

Places
 Jin Prefecture (Shanxi) (晉州), a former Chinese prefecture centered on present-day Linfen, Shanxi
 Jin Prefecture (Shaanxi) (金州), a former Chinese efecture centered on present-day Ankang, Shaanxi
 Jin Prefecture (Hunan) (锦州), a former Chinese prefecture centered on Luyang in present-day Hunan
 Shanxi, official abbreviation Jin (晋)
 Tianjin, official abbreviation Jin (津)

Rivers
 Jin River (Bei River tributary) (锦江, Jǐn Jiāng), a tributary of the Bei River in Guangdong
 Jin River (Sichuan) (锦江, Jǐn Jiāng), a tributary of the Min River in Sichuan
 Jin River (Fujian)(晋江, Jìn Jiāng), a river in Quanzhou Municipality, Fujian
 Jin River (Xiang River tributary) (靳江, Jìn Jiāng), a tributary of the Xiang River in Hunan

Surnames
 Jin (Chinese surname), various Chinese surnames
 Jin (Korean surname), various Korean surnames

Entertainment 
 Jin (manga), a Japanese manga series by Motoka Murakami
 Jin (TV series), a Japanese television adaptation of the manga
 "Jin, the Wind Master", an episode of Yu Yu Hakusho
 Jîn, a 2013 Turkish-German film
 Jin (film), an upcoming Bangladeshi film

People
, Japanese voice actor
, Japanese voice actor
Jin Akimoto (born 1971), Japanese mixed martial artist
MC Jin (born 1982), Hong Kong American rapper
, Japanese musician
, Japanese cyclist
, Japanese footballer
, Japanese handball player
, Japanese table tennis player
 Kim Seok-jin (born 1992), stage name Jin, South Korean singer of the boy band BTS
 Park Jin-woo (born 1996), stage name Jin Jin (진진) South Korean singer of the boy group Astro
Park Myung-eun (born 1996), stage name Jin, South Korean singer with the girl group Lovelyz
, Japanese footballer
, Japanese footballer

Fictional characters
 Jin Kazama, the protagonist of the Tekken video game series
 Jin-Soo Kwon, a character in Lost
 Jin, a character in the O-Parts Hunter series
 Jin, a character in Samurai Champloo media
 Jin, a character in YuYu Hakusho
 Jin Kariya, a character in the anime Bleach
 Jin Kirigiri, a character in Danganronpa
 Jin Kisaragi, a character in BlazBlue video games
 Jin Shirato, a character in Persona 3
 Jin Uzuki, a character in Xenosaga
 Jin Lee, The father of Meilin Lee in Turning Red.
 Jin Ryu, a character in Beyblade
 Jin Kaien, a character in Grand Chase
 Jin, the protagonist of the Choushinsei Flashman
 Jin, an antagonist in Xenoblade Chronicles 2
 Jin Bubaigawa, also known as Twice, an antagonist in My Hero Academia
 Jin Saotome, main protagonist of Cyberbots: Full Metal Madness
 Jin Sakai, main protagonist of Ghost of Tsushima
 Jin Kuwana, main antagonist of Lost Judgment

Other uses 
 JIN, the code for Jinja Airport in Uganda
 Jin Air, a South Korean airline
 Jin language
 Jīn (斤), the Chinese name for the catty, a traditional East Asian unit of weight
 Jin, a deadwood bonsai technique

See also
 Jinhan confederacy (辰韓; 1st century BC – 4th century AD), also known as Qinhan
 Jinn (disambiguation)
 Jinzhou (disambiguation)
 Jinjiang (disambiguation)
 Gin (disambiguation)
 Chin (disambiguation)

Japanese masculine given names